The 2019 season was the New York Jets' 50th in the National Football League, their 60th overall in professional football, their 10th playing home games at MetLife Stadium, their first under general manager Joe Douglas and their first under head coach Adam Gase. This year the team began featuring a new logo and uniform for the first time since 1998. With this new uniform design, the Jets began going for a modern appearance, tweaking the shade of green and adding a black accent similar to what the Arizona Cardinals did in 2005. The Jets improved on their 4–12 record from 2018 but missed the playoffs for the ninth consecutive season after wins by the Titans and Steelers in Week 14. They started the season 1–7 (their worst start in 5 years), but rallied to win six of their last eight, finishing 7–9.

Offseason
On May 15, 2019, the Jets fired general manager Mike Maccagnan after he had already completed almost all the major offseason roster milestones for the 2019 season (including signing big ticket free agents linebacker C.J. Mosley, running back Le'Veon Bell and cornerback Brian Poole, as well as selecting all of the picks in the 2019 NFL Draft). Adam Gase served as interim GM until Joe Douglas was hired to be permanent GM for the 2019 season.

Draft

Notes
The Jets traded their second-round selection (No. 34 overall), along with their 2018 first- and two second-round selections to the Indianapolis Colts in exchange for the Colts' 2018 first-round selection.
The Jets acquired an additional third-round selection in a trade that sent quarterback Teddy Bridgewater and their sixth-round selection to the New Orleans Saints.
The Jets traded their fifth-round selection to the Oakland Raiders in exchange for offensive guard Kelechi Osemele and the Chicago Bears' 2019 6th round draft pick.
Minnesota traded a third-round selection (92nd) to the Jets in exchange for the Jets' third- and seventh-round selections (93rd and 217th).
The Jets traded their fourth-round selection (105th) to the New Orleans Saints in exchange for their fourth- and fifth-round selections (116th and 168th).
The Jets traded their fourth- and fifth-round selection (116th and 168th) to the Tennessee Titans in exchange for their fourth- and fifth-round selection (121st and 157th).

Undrafted free agents

Staff

Final roster

Preseason

Regular season

Schedule
The Jets did not travel outside of the Eastern Time Zone during the  season—preseason or regular season.

Note: Intra-division opponents are in bold text.

Game summaries

Week 1: vs. Buffalo Bills

The Jets forced four turnovers, culminating with a 16–0 lead in the third quarter. However, Bills QB Josh Allen engineered three consecutive scoring drives after Jets LB C. J. Mosley left the game with a groin injury, with the Jets offense unable to respond. In addition, kicker Kaare Vedvik missed both of his kicks, a field goal and an extra point. With the loss, the Jets not only opened the season at 0–1, but became the first team in six years to squander a lead of at least 16 points with a plus-three turnover margin.

Week 2: vs. Cleveland Browns

The Jets used their Stealth black alternate uniforms for the first time ever on Monday Night Football against the Browns. Starting quarterback Sam Darnold was ruled out after coming down with infectious mononucleosis, with backup Trevor Siemian slated to start for the Jets in a rematch of the first Monday Night Football game ever played. Siemian was knocked out of the game after suffering an ankle injury and would later be placed on injured reserve, forcing third-string quarterback Luke Falk into action. After a low-scoring first quarter, the Browns pulled away with a Nick Chubb touchdown run and a field goal in the second quarter, and an 89-yard touchdown reception by Odell Beckham Jr. in the third, though newly signed kicker Sam Ficken successfully made a field goal attempt for the Jets. With the 23–3 loss, the Jets fell to 0–2.

This was also superstar wide receiver Odell Beckham Jr.’s first return to Metlife Stadium. Beckham played for the New York Giants from 2014 to the 2018 NFL season.

Week 3: at New England Patriots

Against archrival New England, the Luke Falk-led Jets offense only mustered 105 total yards and were unable to score as the Patriots dominated the game, though the Jets avoided a shutout with a special teams touchdown by Arthur Maulet and a pick six by CB Jamal Adams, who intercepted Patriots backup quarterback Jarrett Stidham as Tom Brady and other starters were resting at that point. With the loss, the Jets enter their bye week at 0–3.

Week 5: at Philadelphia Eagles

The Jets visited Philadelphia seeking their first ever win against the Philadelphia Eagles, against whom they were 0–10 in the all-time series heading into their Week 5 matchup. They could not get anything going offensively until it was too late in a 31–6 loss. Their only score came in the fourth quarter on a 19-yard run by Vyncint Smith after a muffed punt. New York dropped to 0–4 on the season and 0–11 all-time against Philadelphia with the crushing loss.

Week 6: vs. Dallas Cowboys

Making his first start after recovering from illness, Sam Darnold passed for over 330 yards and two touchdowns as the Jets enjoyed their most effective offensive performance of the year, defeating the visiting Cowboys for their first win in 2019. Their win streak against the Dallas Cowboys continued to 3, as the Cowboys had not beat the Jets since 2007. With the win, the Jets were 1-4.

Week 7: vs. New England Patriots

After a strong performance the previous week, the Jets were shut out at home in a rematch against the Patriots, with Sam Darnold throwing a career-high 4 interceptions during the game. With the disastrous 33–0 loss on Monday Night Football, the Jets fell to 1–5.

Week 8: at Jacksonville Jaguars
With the loss, the Jets fell to 1-6.

Week 9: at Miami Dolphins

Adam Gase faced off against his former team in the Dolphins for the first time since his firing after the previous season. The Jets scored first with a Sam Darnold touchdown pass to Jamison Crowder, but the Dolphins stormed back with three touchdown passes from former Jets quarterback Ryan Fitzpatrick in the second quarter, which was too much for the Jets to overcome due to sloppy play in the second half, including a fumbled snap out of bounds for a safety. With the loss, the Jets not only fell to 1–7, but gave Miami its first win of the year.

Week 10: vs. New York Giants

In a back-and-forth game against the crosstown-rival Giants, the Jets defense limited Giants running back Saquon Barkley to 1 rushing yard on the day and sacked rookie quarterback Daniel Jones six times despite allowing him to pass for 308 yards and 4 touchdowns. But a key Giants fumble when Jamal Adams stripped the ball from the Giants quarterback's hands and duly returned for touchdown, in addition to a more balanced Jets offense, allowed the Jets to win 34–27 to improve to 2–7.

Week 11: at Washington Redskins
With the win, the Jets improved to 3-7, and have a 2 game win streak.

Week 12: vs. Oakland Raiders

With the win, the Jets improved to 4–7, with a 3 game win streak.

Week 13: at Cincinnati Bengals

Facing the Bengals who came into the game with a record of 0-11, the Jets didn't score a single touchdown and didn't have a single offensive drive moving the ball within the Bengals' 20 yard line. With the loss, the Jets fell to 4–8, snapping their 3-game winning streak and giving Cincinnati its first win of the year. This loss, along with the Dolphins loss from Week 9, marks the first time in NFL history a team lost twice to teams who had 0–7 or worse records.

Week 14: vs. Miami Dolphins
The Jets win put them at 5-8.

Week 15: at Baltimore Ravens

The win by the Baltimore Ravens allowed them to successfully clinch the #1 seed in the 2019-20 NFL Playoffs in the AFC. With the loss, the Jets fell to 5–9, and were mathematically eliminated from postseason contention.

Week 16: vs. Pittsburgh Steelers

The Jets beat the visiting Steelers who were still in contention for the playoffs in the 2019 NFL Season. With the win, the Jets improved to 6–9.

Week 17: at Buffalo Bills

In a game that had no impact on the playoff picture in the AFC, the Jets beat the Buffalo Bills in the final game of the season. With the win, the Jets improved to 7-9 and finished tied for 8th place in the AFC with three other teams, the Broncos, the Raiders, and the Colts for the 2019 NFL season, despite winning only two games through 10 weeks of the season.

Standings

Division

Conference

References

External links

New York Jets
New York Jets seasons
New York Jets season
21st century in East Rutherford, New Jersey
Meadowlands Sports Complex